The Girl with the Dragon Tattoo is a 2011 neo-noir psychological thriller film based on the 2005 novel by Swedish writer Stieg Larsson.  It was directed by David Fincher with a screenplay by Steven Zaillian. Starring Daniel Craig as journalist Mikael Blomkvist and Rooney Mara as Lisbeth Salander, it tells the story of Blomkvist's investigation to find out what happened to a girl from a wealthy family who disappeared 40 years ago. He recruits the help of Salander, a computer hacker.

Sony Pictures Entertainment began development on the film in 2009, a co-production of the United States, United Kingdom, Sweden and Germany. It took the company a few months to obtain the rights to the novel, while also recruiting Zaillian and Fincher. The casting process for the lead roles was exhaustive and intense; Craig faced scheduling conflicts, and a number of actresses were sought for the role of Lisbeth Salander. The script took over six months to write, which included three months of analyzing the novel.

The film premiered at Odeon Leicester Square in London on December 12, 2011. A critical and commercial success, the film grossed $232.6 million on a $90 million budget and received highly positive reviews from critics, who praised Craig and Mara's performances as well as Fincher's direction, the score, and the film's tone and visuals. The film was chosen by National Board of Review as one of the top ten films of 2011 and was a candidate for numerous awards, winning, among others, the Academy Award for Best Film Editing, while Mara's performance earned her an Academy Award nomination for Best Actress.

Plot 

In Stockholm, journalist Mikael Blomkvist is recovering from the legal and professional fallout of a libel suit brought against him by businessman Hans-Erik Wennerström. The wealthy Henrik Vanger offers Blomkvist evidence against Wennerström in exchange for an unusual task: investigate the 40-year-old disappearance and presumed murder of Henrik's grandniece, 16-year-old Harriet. 

Every year, Vanger receives a framed pressed flower, the same type she always gave him on his birthday before disappearing. He believes her killer is taunting him. Blomkvist moves into a cottage on the Vanger family estate on Hedestad Island.

Meanwhile, Lisbeth Salander is a young, brilliant asocial investigator and hacker whose state-appointed guardian suffers a stroke. He is replaced by Nils Bjurman, a sadist who controls Salander's finances and extorts sexual favors by threatening to have her institutionalized. Unaware she is recording him, Bjurman chains Salander to his bed and brutally rapes her. At their next meeting, Salander tasers Bjurman, binds him, rapes him with a dildo, and tattoos "I'm a rapist pig" across his chest. Using the secret recording she made, she blackmails him into securing her financial independence and having no further contact with her.

In the meantime, Blomkvist explores the island and interviews Vanger's relatives, learning some were Nazi sympathizers during World War II. He uncovers a list of names and numbers that turn out to be Bible verse references, and recruits Salander as his research assistant. She discovers a connection between the list and numerous young women brutally murdered from 1947 to 1967, indicating a serial killer. Many of the victims have Jewish names, making her theorize that the murders could have been motivated by antisemitism. One morning, Blomkvist finds the mutilated corpse of his cat on the doorstep. Another night, a bullet grazes his forehead; after Salander tends his wounds, they have sex. The pair learn that Harriet's late father, Gottfried, and later Martin, her brother, committed the murders.

While looking for more proof, Blomkvist gets caught by Martin and forced into a specially prepared basement. There, Blomkvist is gassed unconscious and placed in restraints. Martin brags about killing and raping women for decades, like his father, but admits to not knowing what happened to Harriet. Blomkvist is about to get killed when Salander arrives, attacks Martin and forces him to flee. She pursues him on her motorcycle until he runs off the road and hits a propane tank, blowing up the car and killing him. Salander nurses Blomkvist back to health and reveals that, as a child, she was institutionalized after attempting to burn her father alive.

They deduce that Harriet is alive and in hiding; traveling to London, they find her. Harriet reveals that Gottfried sexually abused her when she was 14 for an entire year before she was able to defend herself, accidentally killing him in the process. Martin continued the abuse after Gottfried's death. Her cousin, Anita, smuggled her off the island and let Harriet assume her identity in London, though Anita and her husband were later killed in a car accident. Finally free of her brother, Harriet returns to Sweden and tearfully reunites with Henrik.

As promised, Henrik gives Blomkvist information against Wennerström, but it proves to be outdated and useless. Salander reveals that she has hacked Wennerström's accounts and discovered that he is laundering money for various criminal syndicates. She gives Blomkvist evidence of Wennerström's crimes, which Blomkvist publishes in a scathing editorial, ruining Wennerström and bringing Blomkvist to national prominence. Salander, in disguise, travels to Switzerland and removes two billion euros from Wennerström's secret accounts. Wennerström is later murdered in an apparent gangland shooting.

On her way to give Blomkvist a Christmas present, Salander sees him and his married lover, Erika Berger, being affectionate. She discards the gift and rides away on her motorbike.

Cast 
 Daniel Craig as Mikael Blomkvist: A co-owner for Swedish magazine Millennium, Blomkvist is devoted to exposing the corruptions and malfeasance of government, attracting infamy for his tendency to "go too far". Craig competed with George Clooney, Johnny Depp, Viggo Mortensen and Brad Pitt as candidates for the role. Initial concerns over schedule conflicts with the production of Cowboys & Aliens (2011) and Skyfall (2012) prompted Craig to postpone the casting process. Given the uncertainty surrounding Skyfall following Metro-Goldwyn-Mayer's bankruptcy, Sony Pictures Entertainment and DreamWorks worked out a schedule and Craig agreed to take the part. The British actor was required to gain weight and adopted a neutral accent to befit Stockholm's worldly cultural fabric. Having read the book amid its "initial craze", Craig commented, "It's one of those books you just don't put down" [...] There's just this immediate feeling that bad things are going to happen and I think that's part of why they've been so readable for people."
 Rooney Mara as Lisbeth Salander: Salander is a computer hacker who has survived severe emotional and sexual abuse. The character was a "vulnerable victim-turned-vigilante" with the "take-no-prisoners" attitude of Lara Croft and the "cool, unsentimental intellect" of Spock. Fincher felt that Salander's eccentric persona was enthralling, and stated, "there's a kind of wish fulfillment to her in the way that she takes care of things, the way she will only put up with so much, but there are other sides to her as well." Casting was complicated by the raft of prominent candidates such as Emily Browning, Eva Green, Anne Hathaway, Scarlett Johansson, Keira Knightley, Jennifer Lawrence, Carey Mulligan, Elliot Page, Natalie Portman, Léa Seydoux, Vanessa Hudgens, Sophie Lowe, Sarah Snook, Kristen Stewart, Olivia Thirlby, Mia Wasikowska, Emma Watson, Evan Rachel Wood and Yolandi Visser; Lowe, Mara, Seydoux, and Snook were the final four candidates. Despite the hype, some eventually withdrew from consideration due to the time commitment and low pay. Mara had worked with Fincher in his 2010 film The Social Network. Fincher, while fond of the actress' youthful appearance, found it difficult at first to mold her to match Salander's antisocial demeanor, which was a vast contrast from her earlier role as the personable Erica. Mara went through multiple changes in her appearance to become Salander. Her hair was dyed black and cut into various jagged points, giving the appearance that she cut it herself. In addition to her transgressive appearance, which was described as a "mash-up of brazen Seventies punk and spooky Eighties goth with a dash of S&M temptress" by Lynn Hirschberg of W, Mara participated in a formal screening and was filmed by Fincher on a subway in Los Angeles in an effort to persuade the executives of Sony Pictures that she was a credible choice.
 Christopher Plummer as Henrik Vanger: Vanger is a wealthy businessman who launches an extensive investigation into his family's affairs. Despite calling the Vanger family "dysfunctional", Plummer said of the character: "I love the character of the old man, and I sympathize with him. He's really the nicest old guy in the whole book. Everybody is a bit suspect, and still are at the end. Old Vanger has a nice straight line, and he gets his wish." Plummer wanted to imbue the character with irony, an element he found to be absent from the novel's Henrik. "I think that the old man would have it," he opined, "because he's a very sophisticated old guy [...] used to a great deal of power. So in dealing with people, he would be very good [...] he would be quite jokey, and know how to seduce them." Julian Sands portrays a young Henrik Vanger.
 Stellan Skarsgård as Martin Vanger: Martin is the current CEO of Vanger Industries. Skarsgård was allured by the character's dual nature, and was fascinated that he got to portray him in "two totally different ways". Regarding Martin's "very complex" and "complicated" personality, the Swedish actor said, "He can be extremely charming, but he also can seem to be a completely different person at different points in the film." While consulting with Fincher, the director wanted Skarsgård to play Martin without reference to the book.
 Steven Berkoff as Dirch Frode, Head Legal Counsel for Vanger Industries
 Robin Wright as Erika Berger: Blomkvist's business partner and editor-in-chief of Millennium magazine. She's also Blomkvist's occasional lover.
 Yorick van Wageningen as Nils Bjurman: As Salander's legal guardian, he uses his position to sexually abuse and eventually rape her. Salander turns the tables on him, torturing him and branding him across the torso with the words I AM A RAPIST PIG. Fincher wanted the character to be worse than a typical antagonist, although he did not want to emulate the stereotypical "mustache-twirling pervert". The director considered Van Wageningen to be the embodiment of a versatile actor—one who was a "full-fledged human being" and a "brilliant" actor. "He was able to bring his performance from a logical place in Bjurman's mind and find the seething morass of darkness inside," Fincher stated. Bjurman's multifaceted psyche was the main reason Van Wageningen wanted to play the role. The Dutch actor said, "This character goes through a lot and I wasn't quite sure I wanted to go through all that. I started out half way between the elation of getting to work with David Fincher and the dread of this character, but I was able to use both of those things. We both thought the most interesting route would be for Bjurman to seem half affable. The challenge was not in finding the freak violence in the guy but finding the humanity of him."
 Joely Richardson as Harriet Vanger: Henrik's long-lost grandniece who went into hiding posing as her cousin Anita. In performing her "tricky" character, Richardson recalled that Fincher wanted her to embrace a "darker, edgier" persona, without sugarcoating, and not "resolved or healed". "Even if you were starting to move towards the direction of resolved or healed, he still wanted it edgy and dark. There are no straightforward emotions in the world of this film." Moa Garpendal portrays a young Harriet Vanger.
 Goran Višnjić as Dragan Armansky, head of Milton Security, Salander's employer
 Donald Sumpter as Detective Morell. David Dencik portrays a young Morell.
 Ulf Friberg as Hans-Erik Wennerström, CEO of the Wennerström Group
 Geraldine James as Cecilia Vanger
 Embeth Davidtz as Annika Giannini, Mikael's sister and a lawyer
 Josefin Asplund as Pernilla Blomkvist, Mikael's daughter
 Per Myrberg as Harald Vanger. Gustaf Hammarsten portrays a young Harald.
 Arly Jover as Liv, Martin's girlfriend
 Tony Way as Plague, Salander's hacker friend
 Fredrik Dolk as Bertil Camnermarker, Counsel for the Wennerström Group
 Alan Dale as Detective Isaksson
 Leo Bill as Trinity, another of Salander's hacker friends
 Élodie Yung as Miriam Wu, Salander's occasional lover
 Joel Kinnaman as Christer Malm

Production

Conception and writing 
The success of Stieg Larsson's novel created Hollywood interest in adapting the book, as became apparent in 2009 when Sony's Michael Lynton and Amy Pascal pursued the idea of developing an "American" version unrelated to the Swedish film adaptation released that year. By December, two major developments occurred for the project: Steven Zaillian, who had recently completed the script for Moneyball (2011), became the screenwriter, while producer Scott Rudin finalized a partnership allocating full copyrights to Sony. Zaillian, who was unfamiliar with the novel, got a copy from Rudin. The screenwriter recalled, "They sent it to me and said, 'We want to do this. We will think of it as one thing for now. It's possible that it can be two and three, but let's concentrate on this one.'" After reading the book, the screenwriter did no research on the subject.
Fincher, who was requested with partner Cean Chaffin by Sony executives to read the novel,
was astounded by the series' size and success. As they began to read, the duo noticed that it had a tendency to take "readers on a lot of side trips"—"from detailed explanations of surveillance techniques to angry attacks on corrupt Swedish industrialists," professed The Hollywood Reporter Gregg Kilday. Fincher recalled of the encounter: "The ballistic, ripping-yarn thriller aspect of it is kind of a red herring in a weird way. It is the thing that throws Salander and Blomkvist together, but it is their relationship you keep coming back to. I was just wondering what 350 pages Zaillian would get rid of." Because Zaillian was already cultivating the screenplay, the director avoided interfering. After a conversation, Fincher was comfortable "they were headed in the same direction".

The writing process consumed approximately six months, including three months creating notes and analyzing the novel. Zaillian noted that, as time progressed, the writing accelerated. "As soon as you start making decisions," he explained, "you start cutting off all of the other possibilities of things that could happen. So with every decision that you make you are removing a whole bunch of other possibilities of where that story can go or what that character can do." Given the book's sizable length, Zaillian deleted elements to match Fincher's desired running time. Even so, Zaillan took significant departures from the book. To Zaillian, there was always a "low-grade" anxiety, "but I was never doing anything specifically to please or displease," he continued. "I was simply trying to tell the story the best way I could, and push that out of my mind. I didn't change anything just for the sake of changing it. There's a lot right about the book, but that part, I thought we could do it a different way, and it could be a nice surprise for the people that have read it."

Zaillian discussed many of the themes in Larsson's Millennium series with Fincher, taking the pair deeper into the novel's darker subjects, such as the psychological dissimilarities between rapists and murderers. Fincher was familiar with the concept, from projects such as Seven (1995) and Zodiac (2007). Zaillian commented, "A rapist, or at least our rapist, is about exercising his power over somebody. A serial killer is about destruction; they get off on destroying something. It's not about having power over something, it's about eliminating it. What thrills them is slightly different." The duo wanted to expose the novels' pivotal themes, particularly misogyny. "We were committed to the tack that this is a movie about violence against women about specific kinds of degradation, and you can't shy away from that. But at the same time you have to walk a razor thin line so that the audience can viscerally feel the need for revenge but also see the power of the ideas being expressed." Instead of the typical three-act structure, they reluctantly chose a five-act structure, which Fincher pointed out is "very similar to a lot of TV cop dramas."

Filming 

Fincher and Zaillian's central objective was to maintain the novel's setting. To portray Larsson's vision of Sweden, and the interaction of light on its landscape, Fincher cooperated with an artistic team that included cinematographer Jeff Cronenweth and production designer Donald Graham Burt. The film was wholly shot using Red Digital Cinema Camera Company's RED MX digital camera, chosen to help evoke Larsson's tone. The idea, according to Cronenweth, was to employ unorthodox light sources and maintain a realistic perspective. "So there may be shadows, there may be flaws, but it's reality. You allow silhouettes and darkness, but at the same time we also wanted shots to counter that, so it would not all be one continuous dramatic image." Sweden's climate was a crucial element in enhancing the mood. Cronenweth commented, "It's always an element in the background and it was very important that you feel it as an audience member. The winter becomes like a silent character in the film giving everything a low, cool-colored light that is super soft and non-direct." To get acquainted with Swedish culture, Burt set out on a month-long expedition across the country. He said of the process, "It takes time to start really taking in the nuances of a culture, to start seeing the themes that recur in the architecture, the landscape, the layouts of the cities and the habits of the people. I felt I had to really integrate myself into this world to develop a true sense of place for the film. It was not just about understanding the physicality of the locations, but the metaphysics of them, and how the way people live comes out through design."

Principal photography began in Stockholm, Sweden in September 2010. Production mostly took place at multiple locations in the city's central business district, including at the Stockholm Court House. One challenge was realizing the Vanger estate. Filmmakers wanted to use a typical "manor from Småland" that was solemn, formal, and "very Old Money". "The Swedish are very good at the modern and the minimal but they also have these wonderful country homes that can be juxtaposed against the modern city—yet both speak to money." Principal photography relocated in October to Uppsala. On Queen Street, the facade of the area was renovated to mimic the Hotel Alder, after an old photograph of a building obtained by Fincher. From December onward, production moved to Zurich, Switzerland, where locations were established at Dolder Grand Hotel and the Zurich Airport. Because of the "beautiful" environment of the city, Fincher found it difficult to film in the area. Principal photography concluded in Oslo, Norway, where production took place at Oslo Airport, Gardermoen. Recorded for over fifteen hours, twelve extras were sought for background roles. Filming also took place in the United Kingdom and the United States.

In one sequence the character Martin Vanger plays the song "Orinoco Flow" by Enya before beginning his torture of Mikael Blomkvist. David Fincher, the director, said that he believed that Martin "doesn't like to kill, he doesn't like to hear the screams, without hearing his favorite music" so therefore the character should play a song during the scene. Daniel Craig, the actor who played Blomkvist, selected "Orinoco Flow" on his iPod as a candidate song. Fincher said "And we all almost pissed ourselves, we were laughing so hard. No, actually, it's worse than that. He said, ‘Orinoco Flow!’ Everybody looked at each other, like, what is he talking about? And he said, ‘You know, "Sail away, sail away..."’ And I thought, this guy is going to make Blomkvist as metro as we need."

Title sequence 

Tim Miller, creative director for the title sequence, wanted to develop an abstract narrative that reflected the pivotal moments in the novel, as well as the character development of Lisbeth Salander. It was arduous for Miller to conceptualize the sequence abstractly, given that Salander's occupation was a distinctive part of her personality. His initial ideas were modeled after a keyboard. "We were going to treat the keyboard like this giant city with massive fingers pressing down on the keys," Miller explained, "Then we transitioned to the liquid going through the giant obelisks of the keys." Among Miller's many vignettes was "The Hacker Inside", which revealed the character's inner disposition and melted them away. The futuristic qualities in the original designs provided for a much more cyberpunk appearance than the final product. In creating the "cyber" look for Salander, Miller said, "Every time I would show David a design he would say, 'More Tandy!' It's the shitty little computers from Radio Shack, the Tandy computers. They probably had vacuum tubes in them, really old technology. And David would go 'More Tandy', until we ended up with something that looked like we glued a bunch of computer parts found at a junkyard together."

Fincher wanted the vignette to be a "personal nightmare" for Salander, replaying her darkest moments. "Early on, we knew it was supposed to feel like a nightmare," Miller professed, who commented that early on in the process, Fincher wanted to use an artwork as a template for the sequence. After browsing through various paintings to no avail, Fincher chose a painting that depicted the artist, covered in black paint, standing in the middle of a gallery. Many of Miller's sketches contained a liquid-like component, and were rewritten to produce the "gooey" element that was so desired. "David said let's just put liquid in all of them and it will be this primordial dream ooze that's a part of every vignette," Miller recalled. "It ties everything together other than the black on black."

The title sequence includes abundant references to the novel, and exposes several political themes. Salander's tattoos, such as her phoenix and dragon tattoos, were incorporated. The multiple flower representations signified the biological life cycle, as well as Henrik, who received a pressed flower each year on his birthday. "One had flowers coming out of this black ooze," said Fincher, "it blossoms, and then it dies. And then a different flower, as that one is dying is rising from the middle of it. It was supposed to represent this cycle of the killer sending flowers." Ultimately, the vignette becomes very conceptual because Miller and his team took "a whole thought, and cut it up into multiple different shots that are mixed in with other shots". In one instance, Blomkvist is strangled by strips of newspaper, a metaphor for the establishment squelching his exposes.

In the "Hot Hands" vignette, a pair of rough, distorted hands that embrace Salander's face and melt it represent all that's bad in men. The hands that embrace Blomkvist's face and shatter it, represent wealth and power. Themes of domestic violence become apparent as a woman's face shatters after a merciless beating; this also ties in the brutal beating of Salander's mother by her father, an event revealed in the sequel, The Girl Who Played with Fire (2006).

A cover of Led Zeppelin's "Immigrant Song" (1970) plays throughout the title sequence. The rendition was produced by soundtrack composers Atticus Ross and Nine Inch Nails member Trent Reznor, and features vocals from Yeah Yeah Yeahs lead singer Karen O. Fincher suggested the song, but Reznor agreed only at his request. Led Zeppelin licensed the song only for use in the film's trailer and title sequence. Fincher stated that he sees title sequences as an opportunity to set the stage for the film, or to get an audience to let go of its preconceptions.

Software packages that were primarily used are 3ds Max (for modeling, lighting, rendering), Softimage (for rigging and animation), Digital Fusion (for compositing), Real Flow (for fluid dynamics), Sony Vegas (for editorial), ZBrush and Mudbox (for organic modeling), and VRAY (for rendering).

Soundtrack 

Fincher recruited Reznor and Ross to produce the score; aside from their successful collaboration on The Social Network, the duo had worked together on albums from Nine Inch Nails' later discography. They dedicated much of the year to work on the film, as they felt it would appeal to a broad audience. Akin to his efforts in The Social Network, Reznor experiments with acoustics and blends them with elements of electronic music, resulting in a forbidding atmosphere. "We wanted to create the sound of coldness—emotionally and also physically," he asserted, "We wanted to take lots of acoustic instruments [...] and transplant them into a very inorganic setting, and dress the set around them with electronics."

Even before viewing the script, Reznor and Ross opted to use a redolent approach to creating the film's score. After discussing with Fincher the varying soundscapes and emotions, the duo spent six weeks composing. "We composed music we felt might belong," stated the Nine Inch Nails lead vocalist, "and then we'd run it by Fincher, to see where his head's at and he responded positively. He was filming at this time last year and assembling rough edits of scenes to see what it feels like, and he was inserting our music at that point, rather than using temp music, which is how it usually takes place, apparently." Finding a structure for the soundtrack was arguably the most strenuous task. "We weren't working on a finished thing, so everything keeps moving around, scenes are changing in length, and even the order of things are shuffled around, and that can get pretty frustrating when you get precious about your work. It was a lesson we learned pretty quickly of, 'Everything is in flux, and approach it as such. Hopefully it’ll work out in the end.'"

Release

Pre-release 

A screening for The Girl with the Dragon Tattoo took place on November 28, 2011, as part of a critics-only event hosted by the New York Film Critics Circle. Commentators at the event predicted that while the film would become a contender for several accolades, it would likely not become a forerunner in the pursuit for Academy Award nominations. A promotional campaign commenced thereafter, including a Lisbeth Salander-inspired collection, designed by Trish Summerville for H&M. The worldwide premiere was at the Odeon Leicester Square in London on December 12, 2011, followed by the American opening at the Ziegfeld Theatre in New York City on December 14 and Stockholm the next day. Sony's target demographics were men and women over the age of 25 and 17–34. The film went into general release in North America on December 21, at 2,700 theaters, expanding to 2,974 theaters on its second day. The United Kingdom release was on December 26, Russia on January 1, 2012, and Japan on February 13. India and Vietnam releases were abandoned due to censorship concerns. A press statement from the Central Board of Film Certification stated: "Sony Pictures will not be releasing The Girl with the Dragon Tattoo in India. The censor board has judged the film unsuitable for public viewing in its unaltered form and, while we are committed to maintaining and protecting the vision of the director, we will, as always, respect the guidelines set by the board." In contrast, the National Film Board of Vietnam insisted that the film's withdrawal had no relation to rigid censorship guidelines, as it had not been reviewed by the committee.

Home media 
Sony Pictures Home Entertainment released the film in a DVD and Blu-ray disc combo pack in the United States on March 20, 2012. Bonus features include a commentary from Fincher, featurettes on Blomkvist, Salander, the sets and locations, etc. The disc artwork for the DVD version of the film resembles a Sony brand DVD-R, a reference to the hacker Lisbeth Salander. This caused a bit of confusion in the marketplace with consumers thinking they had obtained a bootleg copy. The release sold 644,000 copies in its first week, in third place behind The Muppets and Hop. The following week, the film sold an additional 144,000 copies generating $2.59 million in gross revenue. , 1,478,230 units had been sold, grossing $22,195,069.

Reception

Box office 
Fincher's film grossed $232.6 million during its theatrical run. The film's American release grossed $1.6 million from its Tuesday night screenings, a figure that increased to $3.5 million by the end of its first day of general release. It maintained momentum into its opening weekend, accumulating $13 million for a total of $21 million in domestic revenue. The film's debut figures fell below media expectations. Aided by positive word of mouth, its commercial performance remained steady into the second week, posting $19 million from 2,914 theaters. The third week saw box office drop 24% to $11.3 million, totaling $76.8 million. The number of theaters slightly increased to 2,950. By the fifth week, the number of theaters shrank to 1,907, and grosses to $3.7 million, though it remained within the national top ten. The film completed its North American theatrical run on March 22, 2012, earning over $102.5 million.

The international debut was in six Scandinavian markets on December 19–25, 2011, securing $1.6 million from 480 venues. In Sweden the film opened in 194 theaters to strong results, accounting for more than half of international revenue at the time ($950,000). The first full week in the United Kingdom collected $6.7 million from 920 theaters. By the weekend of January 6–8, 2012, the film grossed $12.2 million for a total of $29 million; this included its expansion into Hong Kong, where it topped the box office, earning $470,000 from thirty-six establishments. The film similarly led the field in South Africa. It accumulated $6.6 million from an estimated 600 theaters over a seven-day period in Russia, placing fifth. The expansion continued into the following week, opening in nine markets. The week of January 13–15 saw the film yield $16.1 million from 3,910 locations in over forty-three territories, thus propelling the international gross to $49.3 million. It debuted at second place in Austria and Germany, where in the latter, it pulled $2.9 million from 525 locations. Similar results were achieved in Australia, where it reached 252 theaters. The film's momentum continued throughout the month, and by January 22, it had hit ten additional markets, including France and Mexico, from which it drew $3.25 million from 540 venues and $1.25 million from 540 theaters, respectively. In its second week in France it descended to number three, with a total gross of $5.8 million.

The next major international release came in Japan on February 13, where it opened in first place with $3.68 million (¥288 million) in 431 theaters. By the weekend of February 17–19, the film had scooped up $119.5 million from international markets. The total international gross for The Girl with the Dragon Tattoo was $130.1 million. MGM, one of the studios involved in the production, posted a "modest loss" and declared that they had expected the film to gross at least 10% more.

Critical response 

The Girl with the Dragon Tattoo received positive reviews from critics, with particular note to the cast, tone, score and cinematography. The site's critics consensus states, "Brutal yet captivating, The Girl with the Dragon Tattoo is the result of David Fincher working at his lurid best with total role commitment from star Rooney Mara." Metacritic assigned the film a weighted average score of 71 out of 100, based on 41 critics, indicating "generally favorable reviews". Audiences polled by CinemaScore gave the film an average grade of "A" on an A+ to F scale.

David Denby of The New Yorker asserted that the austere, but captivating installment presented a "glancing, chilled view" of a world where succinct moments of loyalty coexisted with constant trials of betrayal. To USA Today columnist Claudia Puig, Fincher captures the "menace and grim despair in the frosty Scandinavian landscape" by carefully approaching its most gruesome features. Puig noted a surfeit of "stylistic flourishes" and "intriguing" changes in the narrative, compared to the original film. In his three-and-a-half star review, Chris Knight of the National Post argued that it epitomized a so-called "paradoxical position" that was both "immensely enjoyable and completely unnecessary". Rene Rodriguez of The Miami Herald said that the "fabulously sinister entertainment" surpassed the original film "in every way". The film took two and a half stars from Rolling Stone commentator Peter Travers, who concluded: "Fincher's Girl is gloriously rendered but too impersonal to leave a mark." A. O. Scott, writing for The New York Times, admired the moments of "brilliantly orchestrated" anxiety and confusion, but felt that The Girl with the Dragon Tattoo was vulnerable to the "lumbering proceduralism" that he saw in its literary counterpart, as evident with the "long stretches of drab, hackneyed exposition that flatten the atmosphere". The Wall Street Journal Joe Morgenstern praised Cronenweth's cinematography, which he thought provided for glossy alterations in the film's darkness; "Stockholm glitters in nighttime exteriors, and its subway shines in a spectacular spasm of action involving a backpack." Rex Reed of The New York Observer professed that despite its occasional incomprehensibility, the movie was "technically superb" and "superbly acted". In contrast, Kyle Smith of New York Post censured the film, calling it "rubbish" and further commenting that it "demonstrates merely that masses will thrill to an unaffecting, badly written, psychologically shallow and deeply unlikely pulp story so long as you allow them to feel sanctified by the occasional meaningless reference to feminism or Nazis."

The performances were a frequent topic in the critiques. Mara's performance, in particular, was admired by commentators. A revelation in the eyes of Entertainment Weekly Owen Gleiberman, he proclaimed that her character was more important than "her ability to solve a crime". Her "hypnotic" portrayal was noted by Justin Chang of Variety, as well as Salon critic Andrew O'Hehir, who wrote, "Rooney Mara is a revelation as Lisbeth Salander, the damaged, aggressive computer geek and feminist revenge angel, playing the character as far more feral and vulnerable than Noomi Rapace’s borderline-stereotype sexpot Goth girl." Scott Tobias of The A.V. Club enjoyed the chemistry between Mara and Craig, as did David Germain of the Associated Press; "Mara and Craig make an indomitable screen pair, he nominally leading their intense search into decades-old serial killings, she surging ahead, plowing through obstacles with flashes of phenomenal intellect and eruptions of physical fury." Although Puig found Mara inferior to Rapace in playing Salander, with regard to Craig's performance, he said that the actor shone. This was supported by Morgenstern, who avouched that Craig "nonetheless finds welcome humor in Mikael's impassive affect". Roger Ebert of the Chicago Sun-Times said the film was given a more assured quality than the original because of Fincher's direction and the lead performances, although he believed this did not always work to the film's advantage, preferring the original version's "less confident surface" where "emotions were closer to the surface."

Accolades 
In addition to numerous awards, The Girl with the Dragon Tattoo was included on several year-end lists by film commentators and publications. It was named the best film of 2011 by MTV and James Berardinelli of ReelViews. The former wrote, "The director follows up the excellent Social Network with another tour de force, injecting the murder mystery that introduces us to outcast hacker Lisbeth Salander [...] and embattled journalist [...] with style, intensity and relentless suspense. Mara is a revelation, and the film's daunting 160-minute runtime breezes by thanks to one heart-racing scene after the next. Dark and tough to watch at times, but a triumph all around." The film came second in indieWire list of "Drew Taylor's Favorite Films Of 2011", while reaching the top ten of seven other publications, including the St. Louis Post-Dispatch, San Francisco Chronicle, and the New Orleans Times-Picayune. The Girl with the Dragon Tattoo was declared one of the best films of the year by the American Film Institute, as well as the National Board of Review of Motion Pictures.

Sequel 

In December 2011, Fincher stated that the creative team involved planned to film the sequels The Girl Who Played with Fire and The Girl Who Kicked the Hornets' Nest, "back to back." There was an announced release date of 2013 for a film version of The Girl Who Played with Fire, although by August 2012 it was delayed due to changes being done to the script, being written by Steven Zaillian. By July 2013, Andrew Kevin Walker was hired to re-write the script. The following year, Fincher stated that a script for The Girl Who Played with Fire had been written and that it was "extremely different from the book," and that despite the long delay, he was confident that the film would be made given that the studio "already has spent millions of dollars on the rights and the script". Mara was less optimistic about the production of the sequels, despite expressing her interest in appearing in them.

By November 2015, it was announced that Sony was proceeding with an adaptation of The Girl in the Spider's Web, a 2015 novel by David Lagercrantz that was a continuation of the original Millennium trilogy after series creator Stieg Larsson died in 2004. Mara was not expected to reprise her role, though she later stated that she was still contractually signed on to do so. The following year, Fede Álvarez was announced by Sony as director, as well as co-screenwriter with Steven Knight and Jay Basu. The Girl in the Spider's Web was notably the first adaptation of an installment in the book series to be produced into an English-language film upon its initial release. By March 2017, Álvarez announced that the film would have an entirely new cast, as he wanted the entire film to be his interpretation of the story.

In September of the same year, Claire Foy was cast as Lisbeth Salander, replacing Mara. The film was released in the U.S. on November 9, 2018.

References

External links 

 
 
 
 
 
 
 
 

Dragon Tattoo Stories (film series)
2011 films
2011 crime thriller films
2011 horror films
LGBT-related horror films
2011 LGBT-related films
2011 psychological thriller films
2011 thriller drama films
2010s mystery drama films
2010s mystery thriller films
2010s serial killer films
American crime thriller films
American detective films
American LGBT-related films
American mystery drama films
American mystery thriller films
American psychological thriller films
American psychological horror films
American serial killer films
American thriller drama films
Columbia Pictures films
2010s English-language films
Female bisexuality in film
Films about journalists
Films about missing people
Films about violence against women
Films based on crime novels
Films based on Swedish novels
Films directed by David Fincher
Films produced by Scott Rudin
Films scored by Atticus Ross
Films scored by Trent Reznor
Films set in London
Films set in Stockholm
Films set in Switzerland
Films set on fictional islands
Films shot in London
Films shot in Los Angeles
Films shot in Norway
Films shot in Stockholm
Films shot in Zürich
Films whose editor won the Best Film Editing Academy Award
Films with screenplays by Steven Zaillian
Incest in film
Lesbian-related films
LGBT-related thriller drama films
Metro-Goldwyn-Mayer films
Patricide in fiction
Rape and revenge films
British crime thriller films
British LGBT-related films
British mystery drama films
British mystery thriller films
British thriller drama films
Swedish crime thriller films
Swedish LGBT-related films
Swedish mystery drama films
Swedish mystery thriller films
Swedish thriller drama films
German crime thriller films
German LGBT-related films
German mystery drama films
German mystery thriller films
German thriller drama films
English-language German films
English-language Swedish films
2010s American films
2010s British films
2010s German films
2010s Swedish films